Max Kremer (born 21 June 1989) is a German professional footballer who plays as a midfielder for Sportfreunde Lotte.

References

1989 births
Living people
People from Pavlodar
German footballers
Association football midfielders
Greifswalder SV 04 players
SV Wilhelmshaven players
SV Meppen players
FC Energie Cottbus players
Sportfreunde Lotte players
Regionalliga players
3. Liga players
Oberliga (football) players